Sa Re Ga Ma Pa Tamil is an 2017 Indian-Tamil language reality singing television show, airs on Zee Tamil and streamed on ZEE5. The show based on the Hindi Language show Sa Re Ga Ma Pa. Over five years, Sa Re Ga Ma Pa has rolled out three seasons and Archana Chandhoke has continued as a host for three seasons. The show serves a sequel to the 2016 shows as Sa Re Ga Ma Pa Lil Champs.

The show is meant for seniors between the ages of 18–60 years. This is the Seniors version of the Sa Re Ga Ma Pa Lil Champs show, which premiered in 2016. It`s about seeks to discover the best playback recording voice and singing talent in Tamil Nadu, India through a series of state-wide auditions. The first season was premiered on 15 October 2017. Currently, Sa Re Ga Ma Pa Seniors (season 3) is taking place , which premiered from 18th December 2022.

Synopsis
The show is a singing competition with the judges selecting the best twenty performers while blindfolded who progress into the next stages.

Series

Judges and Hosts

Judges

Host

Season 1
The first season was aired on Zee Tamil from 15 October 2017 until 14 April 2018 on every Saturday and Sunday. It is a new season of the show Sa Re Ga Ma Pa Lil Champs. The judges are playback singer and music composer Vijay Prakash, playback singer Karthik and playback singer Srinivas, host by Anchor Archana Chandhoke.

On 15 April 2018 during the live telecast of the Grand Finale of the show, Varsha emerged as the title winner of the inaugural edition of the Sa Re Ga Ma Pa Seniors and Rockstar Ramani Ammal claimed the first runners-up trophy.
 Winner : Varsha
 1st Runner up : Rockstar Ramani Ammal
 2nd runner up : Sanjay & Srinidhi
 Best entertainer : Jaskaran Singh

Season 2

The second season aired on every Sunday from 18 May to 10 August 2019 and ended with 25 Episodes. Archana Chandhoke has returned as the host for the second time. Sujatha Mohan, Vijay Prakash and Srinivas as the judges.
 Winner : Aslam
 1st runner up : Karthick and Sukanya
 2nd runner up : Aishwarya

Season 3 

The third season of the Sa Re Ga Ma Pa Seniors premiered on Zee Tamil on 18 December 2022. The four main judges of this show are Srinivas, Karthik, Vijay Prakash and Remya Nambeesan. Remya Nambeesan is the fourth new judge who has joined Sa Re Ga Ma Pa from season 3.Archana Chandhoke has returned as the host for the third time.

Awards and nominations

References

External links
 Sa Re Ga Ma Pa Seniors at ZEE5

Zee Tamil original programming
Tamil-language singing talent shows
Tamil-language reality television series
2017 Tamil-language television series debuts
Tamil-language television shows
2017 Tamil-language television seasons
Television shows set in Tamil Nadu
Tamil-language television series based on Hindi-language television series